Ryan Fogelsonger (born May 26, 1981 in Portsmouth, Virginia) is an American Champion jockey in the sport of Thoroughbred horse racing.

Based in Maryland, Fogelsonger began riding in 2002 but was late getting started, earning his first win on May 1 at Pimlico Race Course in Baltimore, Maryland. He immediately became a consistent winner and on September 18 he rode five winners on a ten-race card at Pimlico Race Course then won five races there again on the October 2nd racecard. At the end of the year, he was voted the Eclipse Award for Outstanding Apprentice Jockey.

Fogelsonger appeared on MTV's True Life on an episode titled "I Want the Perfect Body".

Year-end charts

References

 Ryan Fogelsonger's biography at the NTRA
 October 5, 2002 Thoroughbred Times article titled "Leading apprentice Fogelsonger having solid year"

1981 births
Living people
American jockeys
Eclipse Award winners
Sportspeople from Portsmouth, Virginia